Barbara Anne Hagerman, OPEI (née Oliver; February 9, 1943 – October 6, 2016) was a Canadian music teacher and performer and was the 27th Lieutenant Governor of Prince Edward Island. She was the second woman in the province's history to have held this position.

Life
Born in Hartland, New Brunswick in 1943, siblings Don Oliver and Sue Mazerolle.

She earned a degree from Mount Allison University specializing in voice and organ, and began her career in music in Charlottetown and Summerside, Charlottetown being her current place of residence. She had a very distinguished performance career on the island as a vocal soloist with the P.E.I. Symphony Orchestra. For seventeen years she was the conductor of the Summerside Community Choir which performed throughout the Maritimes and even at Carnegie Hall under her leadership.

Family
She was married to Nelson Hagerman, and together they had two children, Kurt Hagerman (Rupal), Brynne Trites (Matthew) and three grandchildren, Asha Hagerman, Kyle Hagerman and Abigail Trites. Her husband was also the chief organizer for Belinda Stronach in the 2003 Conservative Party leadership race. Prior to her appointment, she did not have any experience in law or politics.

Career
Her appointment to represent Queen Elizabeth II on Prince Edward Island as Lieutenant-Governor was confirmed by the office of Canadian Prime Minister Stephen Harper on July 12, 2006. Hagerman was installed as Lieutenant-Governor on July 31, 2006.  Her duties as Lieutenant Governor were briefly performed by John A. McQuaid from March 12–13, 2008 as the Administrator of Prince Edward Island).

Before her appointment there was some controversy that it was nothing more than a patronage appointment by Prime Minister Stephen Harper. Barbara Hagerman's husband, Nelson Hagerman was the "treasurer of the P.E.I. Chapter of the Conservative Party of Canada, president of the Winsloe-West Royalty Progressive Conservative Association, and the financial agent for the PC party in the province."

Death
She died at the age of 73 from cancer on October 6, 2016.

Arms

References

External links
 Website

1943 births
2016 deaths
People from Carleton County, New Brunswick
People from Summerside, Prince Edward Island
Canadian Presbyterians
Lieutenant Governors of Prince Edward Island
Members of the Order of Prince Edward Island
Mount Allison University alumni
Women in Prince Edward Island politics
Canadian classical musicians
Canadian women viceroys
Deaths from cancer in Prince Edward Island